Walter of Rosières was a French knight who participated in the Fourth Crusade and became the first lord of the Barony of Akova in the Frankish Principality of Achaea. The Chronicle of Morea credits Walter with the construction of the fortress of Akova or Mattegrifon. He died childless, ca. 1273.

Sources
 

1270s deaths
Barons of the Principality of Achaea
Christians of the Fourth Crusade
13th-century French people
Medieval Arcadia
Year of birth unknown